Eumonoicomyces is a genus of fungi in the family Laboulbeniaceae. The genus contain 2 or 3 species.

References

External links
Eumonoicomyces at Index Fungorum

Laboulbeniomycetes